The Commission of Inquiry into the Actions of Canadian Officials in Relation to Maher Arar was a public inquiry investigating the rendition and torture of Maher Arar released on September 18, 2006.  The findings of this Commission are part of Report on the events Related to Maher Arar, also known as the Arar Report. The Commissioner of the inquiry was Justice Dennis O'Connor.

See also
Richard Proulx (RCMP officer)
Royal Canadian Mounted Police

References

External links
Commission of Inquiry into the Actions of Canadian Officials in Relation to Maher Arar (Arar Commission)
Official Court Biography

Commentary
"The Arar Report: The US Should Follow Canada's Lead", JURIST, September 27, 2006
Author Kerry Pither's blog
"Editorial - The Unfinished Case of Maher Arar", The New York Times, February 18, 2009
"My case reveals insincerity of human rights commitments by the U.S." by Maher Arar, The Progressive, Human Rights Day, December 10, 2009
Appeals Court Rules in Maher Arar Case - video report by Democracy Now!
"Getting Away with Torture" by David Cole. The New York Review of Books. Volume 57, Number 1. January 14, 2010.
PRISM Magazine, published by Maher Arar and focused on "in-depth coverage and analysis of national security related issues."

Canadian commissions and inquiries